Football 7-a-side at the 2005 CPISRA World Championships was held in New London, Connecticut from 27 June to 11 July. Football 7-a-side is played by athletes with cerebral palsy, a condition characterized by impairment of muscular coordination, stroke, or traumatic brain injury (TBI).

Football 7-a-side was played with modified FIFA rules. Among the modifications were that there were seven players, no offside, a smaller playing field, and permission for one-handed throw-ins. Matches consisted of two thirty-minute halves, with a fifteen-minute half-time break.

Participating teams and officials

Qualifying
The following teams qualified for the tournament:

Venues
The venues to be used for the World Championships were located in New London, Connecticut.

First group stage

Group 1

Group 2

Group 3 and Group 4
Group 3 and 4 do not provide any information on the ending of the closing tables. On the basis of the tables in groups 5 and 6 of the second group phase, it can be concluded that the following teams have emerged:

  Argentina, 
  Brazil, 
  England &  Wales and 
  Ukraine. 

These three teams played for positions 9 to 13: 
  Japan, 
  South Africa and 
  Spain.

Second group stage

Group 5

Group 6

Group 7

Finals
Position 7-8

Position 5-6

Position 3-4

Final

Statistics

Ranking

See also

References

External links
Official website from 18 December 2005
Cerebral Palsy International Sports & Recreation Association (CPISRA)
International Federation of Cerebral Palsy Football (IFCPF)

2005 in association football
2005
Paralympic association football
Football at the Cerebral Palsy Games
CP football